Hannah Gill (born 29 June 1999) is a Barbadian swimmer. She competed in the women's 400 metre freestyle event at the 2017 World Aquatics Championships.

References

1999 births
Living people
Barbadian female swimmers
Place of birth missing (living people)
Swimmers at the 2014 Summer Youth Olympics
Barbadian female freestyle swimmers
20th-century Barbadian women
21st-century Barbadian women